Gwenfritz is a painted steel abstract stabile, by Alexander Calder. It is located at the National Museum of American History, at 14th Street, and Constitution Avenue, in Washington, D.C.

It was dedicated on June 2, 1969. In 1983, it was relocated from the west front fountain plaza, to a corner location. 
On October 31, 2014, the sculpture was rededicated after being restored and relocated to its original location.

It is named after Gwendolyn Cafritz, widow of Morris Cafritz, who had helped finance the project as head of the Morris and Gwendolyn Cafritz Foundation.

See also
Cheval Rouge, National Gallery of Art Sculpture Garden
List of public art in Washington, D.C., Ward 2

References

External links
After 26 Years, The Smithsonian Will Put Alexander Calder's Gwenfritz Back Where It Belongs
"Industrial remnants", The Washington Post, Blake Gopnik
 
http://virtualglobetrotting.com/map/the-gwenfritz-by-alexander-calder/
http://www.waymarking.com/waymarks/WM9CXY_Gwenfritz_Washington_DC
http://siris-sihistory.si.edu/ipac20/ipac.jsp?&profile=all&source=~!sichronology&uri=full=3100001~!9319~!0#focus

Sculptures by Alexander Calder
1968 sculptures
Sculptures of the Smithsonian Institution
Abstract sculptures in Washington, D.C.
Outdoor sculptures in Washington, D.C.
Steel sculptures in Washington, D.C.
National Mall